= Boutros Romhein =

Syrian sculptor

Boutros Romhein (1949) is a contemporary Syrian sculptor.

Born in 1949 in a southern Syrian town, he grew up in a land where the great Mediterranean civilisations had flourished and where many different peoples evolved their different cultures.

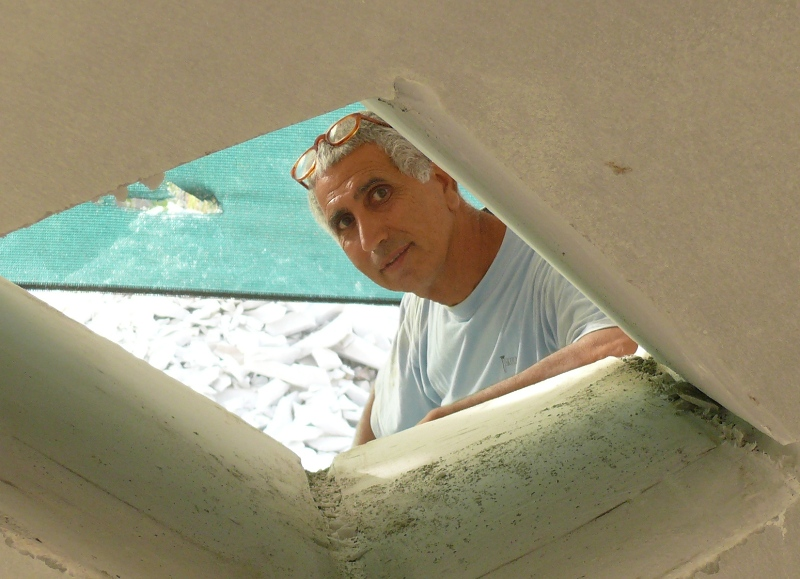
Boutros Romhein

== Background ==
During his classical studies in Damascus Boutros learned crafts techniques as a summer apprentice in the city's workshops. At an early age his vocation as an artist became manifest. At eighteen he opened his own studio in Damascus and began to exhibit in solo and group shows. He continued his preparation as an artist by journeying through Europe – Spain, France, Italy and Switzerland.

== Philosophy ==
Boutros relates to marble as the material that best incarnates what his spirit elaborates.

== The School ==
Boutros Romhein focuses on teaching his sculpting techniques to others while continuing to develop his own skills and work.

== Works ==
Romhein Boutros classifies his works according to three groups: “metaphoric": bearers of forms, based on the attribution of an expression or a story deep-rooted in human life; "figuration": these works go beyond mere figurative art to embrace symbolic forms, through their elegant lines and volumes; lastly, the "monumental" works that become a synthesis of Romhein's individual style.
